A by-election was held in the Dáil Éireann Dublin South-Central constituency in Ireland on 27 October 1999. It followed the death of  Labour Party Teachta Dála (TD) Pat Upton on 22 February 1999.

The election was won by Mary Upton of the Labour Party and sister of Pat Upton. The other candidates being Dublin City Councillor Michael Mulcahy for Fianna Fáil, Dublin City Councillor Catherine Byrne for Fine Gael, Aengus Ó Snodaigh for Sinn Féin, John Goodwillie for the Green Party, Shay Kelly for the Workers' Party, Manus MacMeanmain for Christian Solidarity, Eammon Murphy as an Independent and John Burns for Natural Law. Mulcahy, Byrne and Ó Snodaigh would all go on to represent the constituency as TDs in the future.

Result

See also
List of Dáil by-elections
Dáil constituencies

References

External links
https://electionsireland.org/result.cfm?election=1997B&cons=103
http://irelandelection.com/election.php?elecid=65&electype=2&constitid=22

1999 in Irish politics
1999 elections in the Republic of Ireland
28th Dáil
By-elections in the Republic of Ireland
By-elections in County Dublin
October 1999 events in Europe
1990s in Dublin (city)